Eodiaptomus shihi is a species of crustacean in the family Diaptomidae. It is endemic to India, where it is found in the Gandhi Sagar reservoir, in the Narmada River and in a hill pool in Madhya Pradesh, and is listed as vulnerable on the IUCN Red List.

References

Arthropods of India
Diaptomidae
Freshwater crustaceans of Asia
Taxonomy articles created by Polbot
Crustaceans described in 1992